Julio Romeo López (born 17 July 1922) was a Uruguayan water polo player. He competed in the men's tournament at the 1948 Summer Olympics.

References

External links
 

1922 births
Possibly living people
Uruguayan male water polo players
Olympic water polo players of Uruguay
Water polo players at the 1948 Summer Olympics